The Boneyard is a 1991 American direct-to-video horror film directed by James Cummins and starring Ed Nelson, Deborah Rose, Norman Fell, James Eustermann, and Phyllis Diller.

Plot
The film plunges into the nightmarish experiences of a depressed psychic (Deborah Rose), whose involvement in a grisly child-murder case leads her and her detective partner (Ed Nelson) to an imposing, fortress-like mortuary. Chen (Robert Yun Ju Ahn), the owner of the funeral home and prime suspect in the case, claims the three mummified corpses in question are not children but ancient demons known as "kyoshi". It seems the little monsters have been around for centuries as a result of an age-old curse and can only be placated with offerings of human flesh — with which the mortician has been supplying them his entire life. When Chen is jailed on murder charges, the under-fed ghouls awaken in search of dinner, trapping the staff inside the mortuary walls and devouring them. The survivors, including Rose and Nelson, use every means at their disposal to combat the demons, which have possessed the bodies of morgue attendant Mrs. Poopinplatz (Phyllis Diller) and her poodle, mutating them into hideous monsters.

Cast
 Ed Nelson as Jersey Callum
 Deborah Rose as Alley Oates
 Norman Fell as Shepard
 James Eustermann as Gordon Mullin
 Denise Young as Dana
 Willie Stratford as Marty(as Willie Stratford Jr.)
 Phyllis Diller as Miss Poopinplatz
 Robert Yun Ju Ahn as Chen
 Richard F. Brophy as Mac(as Rick Brophy)
 Sallie Middleton Kaltreider as Little Ghoul
 Janice Dever as Medium Ghoul
 Cindy Dollar-Smith as Big Ghoul
 Michael Haun as Floofsoms and Poopinplatz Ghouls
 Brian Ahn as Dead Child #2
 Jessica Lasher as Dead Child #3
 Bo Sook Ahn as Oriental Mother(as Boo Sook Ahn)
 Edward Mau-Tung Sun as Oriental Father
 Christopher Finch as Sorcerer

Production

Shooting took place in Statesville, North Carolina, in 1989.  In December 1989, a botched special effect caused a fire.

Reception

Patrick Naugle of DVD Verdict called it "good, goofy fun."  Steve Simels of Entertainment Weekly rated the film B− and described it as a film destined to be a cult classic.  In a negative review, Lawrence Cohn of Variety stated that, instead of being funny, the film "comes off as merely silly".  Adam Tyner of DVD Talk rated it 2.5/5 stars and said that the film wastes too much time on setup rather than the campy monsters that have brought it a cult following.  Writing in The Zombie Movie Encyclopedia, academic Peter Dendle called it an "energetic but directionless fiend-fest".  Dendle praised the acting and serious nature of the first hour but said later scenes cause the tone to "just get silly".

References

External links
 
 
 

1991 direct-to-video films
1991 horror films
1991 films
American direct-to-video films
American zombie films
Direct-to-video horror films
1990s English-language films
1990s American films